Berling is a surname. Notable people with the surname include:

Charles Berling (born 1958), French actor and director
Ernst Henrich Berling, (1708–1750) German-Danish book printer and publisher
Peter Berling (1934–2017), German actor and writer
Zygmunt Berling (1896–1980), Polish general

Fictional characters:
Gösta Berling, main character of Gösta Berlings Saga by Selma Lagerlöf